Oleksiy Yuriyovych Len (born June 16, 1993), commonly known as Alex Len, is a Ukrainian professional basketball player for the Sacramento Kings of the National Basketball Association (NBA). Before being drafted, he played two seasons for the Maryland Terrapins (then in the Atlantic Coast Conference) as well as a season with Dnipro.

Early life
Len was born in Antratsyt, Luhansk, Ukraine to a mother named Yulia, who ran track early in her life. Growing up, Len participated in gymnastics and liked watching Jackie Chan films. As a young gymnast, Len was trained by Oleksiy Stepanenko, who had also trained Olympic gold medalist Ihor Korobchynskyi. He started playing basketball at the age of 13 and later attended Dnipropetrovsk Higher College in Dnipropetrovsk, Ukraine. He played for the Ukraine national team at the 2009 FIBA Europe Under-16 Championship and the 2010 FIBA Europe Under-18 Championship, where during the 2010 tournament, he was the fourth-best overall scorer, second-best rebounder, and the best shot blocker. Following the tournament, Len joined BC Dnipro of the Ukrainian Basketball SuperLeague for the 2010–11 season.

College career

Len was recruited by then Maryland assistant basketball coach, Scott Spinelli. He was the recipient of an athletic scholarship from the University of Maryland coach Gary Williams, but Williams resigned after the 2010–11 season. Mark Turgeon was hired to take his place. While Williams began recruiting Len, it was Turgeon and Spinelli who eventually lured him to Maryland. Len underachieved in his freshman year, averaging 6 points, 5.5 rebounds, and 2.2 blocks per game, but showed lottery pick potential after serving a ten game suspension at the beginning of the year due to NCAA amateurism issues resulting from his play with BC Dnipro Dnipropetrovsk, a European club team from his home nation.

Len opened his sophomore season on November 9, 2012, against the reigning champion Kentucky Wildcats, led by ESPN's #1 player of the 2012 recruiting class, Nerlens Noel. The game was played at the brand-new Barclays Center in Brooklyn. Len overpowered Noel throughout the entire game, scoring 23 points with 12 rebounds and 4 blocks, while holding Noel to just four points, although Kentucky won the game 72–69. Following the game, there was talk that Len could potentially be a top 5 pick in the upcoming draft. On January 16, 2013, Len scored 10 points, including a game-winning shot with 0.9 seconds in the game, upsetting #14 North Carolina State with a 52–50 win. On February 16, 2013, Len played a role in Maryland's 83–81 victory over the top ranked Duke Blue Devils. Len put up 19 points, 9 rebounds and 3 blocks, while holding Duke star senior Mason Plumlee to four points. He went on to average 11.9 points per game in 38 total games that season.

On April 14, 2013, Len decided to declare for the 2013 NBA draft. He was projected to land in the lottery, with some experts projecting Len as the #1 overall pick. On May 3, 2013, Len ended up getting surgery on his left ankle that resulted in him being out for several months, ultimately causing him to sit out from the 2013 NBA Summer League.

Professional career

Phoenix Suns (2013–2018)

2013–14 season
Len was selected fifth overall by the Phoenix Suns in the 2013 NBA draft. Len was the second international-born player to be selected in that draft, behind the first overall selection in Canadian-born Anthony Bennett, as well as the highest-selected Ukrainian-born player to be drafted in the NBA, which was a record previously held by Vitaly Potapenko in 1996. He was also the first Suns player to be taken in the top 5 of an NBA draft since Armen Gilliam in 1987. Due to his ankle surgeries, Len did not join the Suns for the 2013 NBA Summer League. On July 12, 2013, Len had surgery on his right ankle due to a stress fracture. He signed with the Suns on August 29, 2013, and was cleared to practice with them by early September.

Len made his NBA debut on November 1, 2013, at home in a close victory against the Utah Jazz. He sat out seven games before returning on November 19 against the Sacramento Kings. However, a day later, Len re-injured his left knee and missed over six weeks before returning on January 7 against the Chicago Bulls. Len had his first 10-rebound game in a 126–117 win over the Milwaukee Bucks on January 29, 2014.

2014–15 season
In July 2014, Len joined the Phoenix Suns for the 2014 NBA Summer League. In the Suns' first game of the Summer League, Len recorded 6 points and 6 rebounds against the Golden State Warriors before fracturing his right pinkie finger and was subsequently ruled out until training camp. On October 7, 2014, a day before the Suns' first pre-season game of 2014 against Brazilian club Flamengo, Len fractured the same pinkie finger again, forcing him to the sidelines once more. He returned to action two weeks later in the Suns' pre-season game against the Los Angeles Clippers on October 22.

On October 31, 2014, Len recorded his first career double-double with career-highs in points and rebounds with 10 and 11, respectively, in the Suns' 94–89 win over the San Antonio Spurs. On November 17, he scored a then career-high 19 points in a 118–114 win over the Boston Celtics. Len started his first game on December 15 against the Milwaukee Bucks and continued to start for the Suns until February 5 when injured his ankle after a failed alley-oop attempt in the third quarter against the Portland Trail Blazers. After missing three games due to the injury, he returned to action on February 20 to record 11 points, 10 rebounds and a career-high six blocks in a loss to the Minnesota Timberwolves. On April 2, he underwent successful surgery to repair his broken nose, an injury he suffered against the Portland Trail Blazers on March 30. He subsequently missed the final seven games of the season.

2015–16 season
In July 2015, Len re-joined the Suns for the 2015 NBA Summer League in Las Vegas where in five games, he averaged 10.8 points and 9.8 rebounds per game. Following the conclusion of the Summer League, Len began training with his new teammate Tyson Chandler, as well as rival center and one of Len's personal favorite players, Tim Duncan, throughout the off-season. On December 9, Len recorded a then career-high 20 points and 14 rebounds in a 107–104 win over the Orlando Magic. On January 11, he was ruled out for three games with a left hand sprain. On February 4, he recorded 12 points and a career-high 18 rebounds in a 111–105 loss to the Houston Rockets. On February 21, he recorded a then career-high 23 points and 13 rebounds in a 118–111 loss to the San Antonio Spurs. He went on to set a new career high on March 4, recording 31 points along with 15 rebounds in a 102–84 win over the Orlando Magic. Two days later, Len recorded 19 points, 16 rebounds and a career-high 6 assists in a 109–100 win over the Memphis Grizzlies. On March 17, he recorded his 10th straight game with 10+ rebounds. On April 7, he recorded a career-high seven assists in a 124–115 win over the Houston Rockets. Len appeared in 78 games for the Suns in 2015–16, starting in 46 of them, both career highs. He recorded 19 double-doubles and finished with averages of 9.0 points, 7.6 rebounds and 1.2 assists, all career highs.

2016–17 season

After going 0–4 to start the season, Len helped the Suns record their first win on November 2 with 18 points in a 118–115 overtime victory over the Portland Trail Blazers. On November 8, he recorded 16 points and a season-high 14 rebounds in a 107–100 win over the Detroit Pistons. On December 9, he recorded 14 points, 13 rebounds and a season-high five blocks off the bench in a 119–115 win over the Los Angeles Lakers. On February 10, 2017, he was suspended one game without pay for leaving the bench area and entering the playing court during an altercation in the Suns' 110–91 loss to the Memphis Grizzlies two days earlier.

2017–18 season
Following the 2016–17 season, Len became a restricted free agent. On September 25, 2017, after spending the off-season looking to get a better deal, Len signed a one-year, $4.2 million qualifying offer to return to the Suns. On November 17, 2017, Len had 17 points and 18 rebounds in a 122–113 win over the Los Angeles Lakers. On November 28, 2017, he tied a career high with 18 rebounds in a 104–99 win over the Chicago Bulls. On December 16, 2017, he had 12 points and a career-high 19 rebounds in a 108–106 win over the Minnesota Timberwolves. On March 2, 2018, he had six blocks in a 124–116 loss to the Oklahoma City Thunder.

Atlanta Hawks (2018–2020)
On August 3, 2018, Len signed a two-year, $8.5 million contract with the Atlanta Hawks. On December 23, 2018, he had 15 points and a season-high 17 rebounds in a 98–95 win over the Detroit Pistons. On March 3, 2019, he scored a then season-high 28 points with a career-high five 3-pointers in a 123–118 win over the Chicago Bulls. On April 7, he scored a career-high 33 points, including a career-best six 3-pointers, in a 115–107 loss to the Milwaukee Bucks.

Sacramento Kings (2020)
On February 6, 2020, Len and Jabari Parker were traded to the Sacramento Kings in exchange for Dewayne Dedmon and two second round picks.

Toronto Raptors (2020–2021)
On November 29, 2020, Len signed with the Toronto Raptors. He was waived by the Raptors on January 19, 2021, after 13 regular season games.

Washington Wizards (2021)
On January 23, 2021, Len signed with the Washington Wizards.

Return to Sacramento (2021–present)
On August 13, 2021, Len signed with the Sacramento Kings. On January 7, 2022, he recorded a season-high 18 points, alongside ten rebounds and two steals, in a 111–121 loss to the Denver Nuggets.

National team career
Len played for Ukraine's Under-16 national team during the 2009 FIBA Europe Under-16 Championship. Despite his performance throughout the tournament, which included a 20-point outing against Israel and averaging 8.0 points, 4.8 rebounds, 1.6 assists, and being the second-best shot blocker in the tournament with 2.6 blocks per game, the Under-16 national team was relegated under the Division B section after the tournament for over a year's time. He played with his nation's Under-18 national team for the 2010 FIBA Europe Under-18 Championship. Unlike in the Under-16 Tournament he participated in back in 2009, Len helped the Under-18 team stay in the Division A tournaments for at least another year. His performance throughout the tournament led to the University of Maryland, along with a few other universities like Virginia Tech, gaining enough interest in him to get him on their team.

In August 2018, Len was named to play for the Ukraine national basketball team for the first time at the 2019 FIBA World Cup qualifiers in September.

Career statistics

NBA

Regular season

|-
| style="text-align:left;"|
| style="text-align:left;"|Phoenix
| 42 || 3 || 8.6 || .423 ||  || .645 || 2.4 || .1 || .1 || .4 || 2.0
|-
| style="text-align:left;"| 
| style="text-align:left;"|Phoenix
| 69 || 44 ||22.0|| .507 || .333 || .702 || 6.6 || .5 || .5 || 1.5 || 6.3
|-
| style="text-align:left;"|
| style="text-align:left;"|Phoenix
| 78 || 46 || 23.3 || .423 || .143 || .728 || 7.6 || 1.2 || .5 || .8 || 9.0
|-
| style="text-align:left;"|
| style="text-align:left;"|Phoenix
| 77 || 34 || 20.2 || .497 || .250 || .721 || 6.6 || .6 || .5 || 1.3 || 8.0
|-
| style="text-align:left;"|
| style="text-align:left;"|Phoenix
| 69 || 13 || 20.2 || .566 || .333 || .684 || 7.5 || 1.2 || .4 || .9 || 8.5
|-
| style="text-align:left;"|
| style="text-align:left;"|Atlanta
| 77 || 31 || 20.1 || .494 || .363 || .648 || 5.5 || 1.1 || .4 || .9 || 11.1
|-
| style="text-align:left;"|
| style="text-align:left;"|Atlanta
| 40 || 9 || 18.6 || .546 || .250 || .630 || 5.8 || 1.1 || .5 || .8 || 8.7
|-
| style="text-align:left;"|
| style="text-align:left;"|Sacramento
| 15 || 3 || 15.0 || .593 || .667 || .708 || 6.1 || .5 || .2 || 1.0 || 5.9
|-
| style="text-align:left;"|
| style="text-align:left;"|Toronto
| 7 || 2 || 10.9 || .500 || .500 || .500 || 1.6 || .4 || .1 || .9 || 2.3
|-
| style="text-align:left;"|
| style="text-align:left;"|Washington
| 57 || 40 || 15.8 || .619 || .263 || .636 || 4.4 || .8 || .3 || 1.0 || 7.1
|-
| style="text-align:left;"|
| style="text-align:left;"|Sacramento
| 39 || 10 || 15.9 || .534 || .286 || .651 || 4.1 || 1.2 || .3 || .6 || 6.0
|- class="sortbottom"
| style="text-align:center;" colspan="2"|Career
| 570 || 235 || 18.9 || .507 || .329 || .683 || 5.9 || .9 || .4 || 1.0 || 7.7

Playoffs

|-
| style="text-align:left;"|2021
| style="text-align:left;"|Washington
| 5 || 3 || 8.4 || .571 || — || .571 || 2.2 || .4 || .2 || .0 || 4.0
|- class="sortbottom"
| style="text-align:center;" colspan="2"|Career
| 5 || 3 || 8.4 || .571 || — || .571 || 2.2 || .4 || .2 || .0 || 4.0

College

|-
| style="text-align:left;"|2011–12
| style="text-align:left;"|Maryland
| 22 || 11 || 21.2 || .553 || .000 || .587 || 5.4 || .6 || .2 || 2.1 || 6.0
|-
| style="text-align:left;"|2012–13
| style="text-align:left;"|Maryland
| 38 || 37 || 26.4 || .534 || .125 || .686 || 7.8 || 1.0 || .2 || 2.1 || 11.9
|- class="sortbottom"
| style="text-align:center;" colspan="2"|Career
| 60 || 48 || 24.5 || .538 || .111 || .663 || 7.0 || .8 || .2 || 2.1 || 9.7

Personal life
In December 2015, Len and his mother, Yulia, created the Len-d A Hand Foundation, a charity that helps reach out to the youth in Phoenix, Arizona and other surrounding areas. A strong swimmer, on April 25, 2016 he helped save his friend and a lifeguard from drowning at a beach in the Dominican Republic.

References

External links

 Maryland Terrapins bio
 ESPN profile
 FIBA profile

1993 births
Living people
Atlanta Hawks players
BC Dnipro players
Centers (basketball)
Maryland Terrapins men's basketball players
National Basketball Association players from Ukraine
People from Antratsyt
Phoenix Suns draft picks
Phoenix Suns players
Sacramento Kings players
Toronto Raptors players
Ukrainian expatriate basketball people in the United States
Ukrainian expatriate sportspeople in Canada
Ukrainian men's basketball players
Washington Wizards players
Sportspeople from Luhansk Oblast